Ruan Xiaowu, also known as Ruan the Fifth, is a fictional character in Water Margin, one of the Four Great Classical Novels of Chinese literature. Nicknamed "Lives-Shortening Second Brother", he ranks 29th among the 36 Heavenly Spirits of the 108 Stars of Destiny.

Background
The novel depicts Ruan Xiaowu as having eyes that are like bells and arms like iron staffs. Although he is always smiling, Ruan Xiaowu, who is tattooed on the chest with a leopard,  has a murderous glint in his eyes. His nickname "Lives-shortening Second Brother" suggests he gives no quarter to anyone who crosses him.

The middle one among the Ruan brothers, Ruan Xiaowu is junior to Ruan Xiaoer and senior to Ruan Xiaoqi. The three live in Shijie Village (石碣村; in present-day Liangshan County, Shandong) where they make a living by fishing in the waters around Liangshan Marsh. Skilled in swimming, the brothers fight well in underwater combat. A hardcore gambler, Ruan Xiaowu seems to have not much luck in gaming.

Becoming an outlaw
Wu Yong recommends involving the three Ruan brothers when Chao Gai, headman of Dongxi village in Yuncheng County, seeks his advice on whether to hijack valuables in transportation to the Grand Tutor Cai Jing in the imperial capital Dongjing. Visiting the Ruans in Shijie Village, Wu claims that he has come to buy some fish before proceeding to find out whether they are receptive to the bold proposal. Ruan Xiaoer senses Wu is up to something else. Although the other two brothers are similarly straightforward and less astute, Ruan Xiaowu tends to be more brusque than Ruan Xiaoqi. Nevertheless all three are unhappy with their poverty and resent being bullied by officials. So when Wu Yong comes to his point, they unanimously accept the invitation. The robbers, numbering seven including Liu Tang and Gongsun Sheng and with the help of Bai Sheng, who poses as a wine seller, succeed in seizing the valuables at the Yellow Mud Ridge by drugging the escorts of the gifts led by Yang Zhi.

But the authorities soon track down essential clues and an arrest party is sent to seize Chao Gai at his house. Chao, Wu Yong, Gongsun Sheng and Liu Tang flee to Shijie village. The Ruan brothers, familiar with the surrounding waters, lure the soldiers who have come for them into the waterways and wipe them out. The seven men then seek refuge in the bandit stronghold of Liangshan Marsh.

Wang Lun, the leader of Liangshan, tries to send them away with gifts fearing that they might usurp his position. Wu Yong, sensing Lin Chong's unhappiness with Wang, instigates him to kill the leader. Chao Gai is then elected the new chief of Liangshan, with Ruan Xiaowu taking the seventh position.

Campaigns and death
Ruan Xiaowu is appointed as one of the commanders of Liangshan's flotilla after the 108 Stars of Destiny came together in what is called the Grand Assembly. He participates in the campaigns against the Liao invaders and rebel forces in Song territory following amnesty from Emperor Huizong for Liangshan.

In the battle of Qingxi County (清溪縣; present-day Chun'an County, Zhejiang), the last leg of the campaign against Fang La, Ruan Xiaowu and Li Jun falsely defect to the enemy side to collect intelligence. They set the county on fire when the opportunity arises and let in the Liangshan force. However, Fang's premier Lou Minzhong runs into Ruan Xiaowu and kills him.

References
 
 
 
 
 
 
 

36 Heavenly Spirits
Fictional fishers
Fictional characters from Shandong